Upsilon Boötis (υ Boötis) is a single, orange-hued star in the northern constellation of Boötes. It is a fourth magnitude star that is visible to the naked eye. Based upon an annual parallax shift of 12.38 mas as seen from the Earth, it is located about 263 light years from the Sun. The star is moving closer to the Sun with a radial velocity of −6 km/s.

This is an evolved K-type giant star with a stellar classification of K5.5 III. Astroseismology was used to obtain a mass estimate of 1.11 times the mass of the Sun, while interferometric measurements give a size of about 38 times the Sun's radius. It is radiating about 332 times the Sun's luminosity from its enlarged photosphere at an effective temperature of 3,920 K.

References

External links
 
 

K-type giants
Boötes
Bootis, Upsilon
Durchmusterung objects
Bootis, 05
120477
067459
5200